Tilted Thunder Roller Derby (TTRD) is a Seattle, Washington based, all-female, banked track roller derby league. They are a 501(c)3 nonprofit organization run by a volunteer force of skaters and league members committed to promoting and raising awareness of women's roller derby, especially banked track roller derby. TTRD is composed of friendly, intelligent, enthusiastic, and strong women from all walks of life pursuing emotional growth and physical strength by challenging their perceived limits. As a league, they also wish to promote mental and physical empowerment, development of skills, loyalty on and off the track, individuality, and friendship  throughout the entire sport.

Overview
The modern reincarnation of community-based, Do-It-Yourself banked track roller derby is only just beginning to experience the kind of growth that flat-track roller derby saw only a few years ago. Not only is TTRD the only modern banked track league in the Pacific Northwest, it is one of only a handful of modern DIY banked track leagues in the entire country. Many DIY leagues have already built their own banked tracks: Los Angeles Derby Dolls, San Diego Derby Dolls, and Arizona Derby Dames (Phoenix). In fact, while there are over 400 flat-track leagues in the United States, TTRD was only the 7th roller derby league to build a banked track in the nation. TTRD is also a 501(c)3 nonprofit organization.

Tilted Thunder has four home teams: an All Star travel team and two junior derby programs: Peeps and Chicklets.

Mission statement:  As a 501(c)3 nonprofit organization, Tilted Thunder is committed to fostering competition on a national and international level, developing amateur athletes for competition, and promoting the physical and mental strength and independent spirit of amateur female athletes.

Tilted Thunder is a founding member of the Roller Derby Coalition of Leagues.

Teams
Tilted Thunder is one of several active banked track roller derby leagues in the country. The skaters bout under the Roller Derby Coalition of Leagues (RDCL). Between 2008 and 2011, Tilted Thunder was made up of two teams: Red Team and Purple Team. In 2011, the first season featured four current intra-league competitors:

 The Rolling Blackouts
Season 1 Champions
Season 2 Champions
Season 5 Champions
 Royal Crush
 Saint Hellions
Season 3 Champions
Season 4 Champions
Season 6 Champions
 Sugar Skulls

Skaters who do not skate on home teams are called "Chicks." They hone their skills in the "Chick Pool" until a home team drafts them.

The All Star team is TTRD's travel team.

Peeps and Chicklets (Junior's Program)

Tilted Thunder expanded banked track roller derby to young women in January 2011.

Chicklets
Chicklets are for girls age 6 to 13.
Peeps
Peeps range from 11 to 17 years old. Additionally, they play full contact roller derby.

Battle on the Bank

June 1–3, 2012, the Tilted Thunder Rail Birds hosted Battle on the Bank V, the US Banked Track Roller Derby National Tournament.
The tournament returned to the Pacific Northwest (PNW) again on June 5–7, 2015 and June 1-3, 2018. Both the Battle on the Bank VIII and BotB XI were hosted by TTRD at the Evergreen State Fairgrounds, Monroe, WA.

Tilted Thunder has participated in Battle on the Bank since 2010.  TTRD All-Stars placed 3rd in Battle on the Bank VII and VIII. The Peeps All-Stars placed 1st for the first time in Battle on the Bank VIII.

Community Involvement

Tilted Thunder Roller Derby is always reaching out to help make their community a better place. Below are only some of their most recent volunteer projects:

•	Green Seattle Partnership - Cleaned the Burke-Gilman trail of trash and blackberry bushes.
•	Relay for Life - raised money for Cancer Survivors.
•	Pennies for Peace - collected pennies for education opportunities for children in Pakistan and Afghanistan.
•	Save your A@* for the Track- Tilted Thunder hosted a self defense class taught by Joanna Factor with Strategic Living.
•	Harborview Medical Center- Collected toiletries for ICU Patient family members.
•	Parent Child Assistance Program-toy and gift drive.
•	Northwest Harvest- Collected food for Seattle food banks.
•	Second Harvest Japan- Skate for Japan fundraiser at Lynnwood to aid those devastated by the Japanese earthquake.
•	Bellevue Arthritis Walk 2011- TTRD skaters led the walk at Crossroads Park on May 21, 2011
•	Toys for Tots - Toy drive
•	Housing Hope - Toiletry drive

See also

List of roller derby leagues
History of roller derby
Battle on the Bank

References

External links
Potential Fresh Meat Roller Derby Practice Squad
Tilted Thunder's Flight School and Tryouts Information

Sports in Seattle
Roller derby leagues established in 2008
Roller derby leagues in Washington (state)
Roller Derby Coalition of Leagues
Railway sports teams
2008 establishments in Washington (state)